The São Tomé thrush or olivaceous thrush (Turdus olivaceofuscus) is a species of bird in the family Turdidae. It is endemic to São Tomé. Until 2010, the related Príncipe thrush (Turdus xanthorhynchus) was considered a subspecies, Turdus olivaceofuscus xanthorhynchus.

Its natural habitats are subtropical or tropical moist lowland forests and subtropical or tropical moist montane forests. It is threatened by habitat loss.

References

Birds described in 1852
Endemic birds of São Tomé and Príncipe
Endemic fauna of São Tomé Island
Turdus
Taxonomy articles created by Polbot